Guillemot is the common name for several species of seabird in the Alcidae or auk family (part of the order Charadriiformes). In British use, the term comprises two genera: Uria and Cepphus. In North America the Uria species are called murres and only the Cepphus species are called "guillemots". This word of French origin derives from a form of the name William, cf. .

The two living species of Uria, together with the razorbill, dovekie, and the extinct great auk, make up the tribe Alcini. They have distinctly white bellies, thicker and longer bills than Cepphus, and form very dense colonies on cliffs during the reproductive season. Guillemot eggs are large (around 11% of female weight), pyriform in shape, and colourful, making them attractive targets for egg collectors.

The three living species of Cepphus form a tribe of their own: Cepphini.  They are smaller than the Uria species and have black bellies, rounder heads and bright red feet.

Systematics

Uria
Common murre or common guillemot, Uria aalge
Thick-billed murre or Brünnich's guillemot, Uria lomvia

Some prehistoric species are also known:

 Uria bordkorbi (Monterey or Sisquoc Late Miocene of Lompoc, USA)
 Uria affinis (Late Pleistocene of E USA)—possibly a subspecies of U. lomvia
 Uria paleohesperis

U. brodkorbi is the only known occurrence of the Alcini tribe in the temperate to subtropical Pacific, except for the very fringe of the range of U. aalge.

Cepphus
 Black guillemot or tystie,  Cepphus grylle

 Pigeon guillemot, Cepphus columba 
 Spectacled guillemot, Cepphus carbo

As in other genera of auks, fossils of prehistoric forms of Cepphus have been found:

 Cepphus olsoni (San Luis Rey River Late Miocene—Early Pliocene of W USA)
 Cepphus cf. columba (Lawrence Canyon Early Pliocene of W USA)
 Cepphus cf. grylle (San Diego Late Pliocene, W USA)

The latter two resemble the extant species, but because of the considerable distance in time or space from their current occurrence, they may represent distinct species.

Pyriform egg 
Guillemots lay a single pyriform egg on a cliff edge in dense breeding colonies. They do not build a nest. The egg is popularly believed to roll in an arc when disturbed, preventing it from falling over the cliff edge. This may be true of a museum specimen on a flat surface, but has not been proven to occur naturally.

Guillemot eggs were collected until the late 1920s in Scotland's St Kilda islands by their men scaling the cliffs. The eggs were buried in St Kilda peat ash to be eaten through the cold, northern winters. The eggs were considered to taste like duck eggs in taste and nourishment.

Bounciness in chicks 
Guillemot chicks are born on rocky cliffs near the seaside. They leave the nest by jumping off the cliffsides before their wings are strong enough to allow them to fly, so they parachute down toward the ground as opposed to flying. Their dense, downy feathers and underdeveloped wings allow them to avoid serious harm when falling to the ground, so they bounce around slightly after making impact with the ground.

In film 

In a crucial scene of the 1937 film The Edge of the World, the character Peter tries to get a guillemot's egg, for which a collector had promised to pay five pounds. The egg can be found in a nest on a steep cliff, which Peter climbs down tied to a rope. As he is climbing back up, the rope frays and Peter falls to his death.

References

Birds of Greenland
 
Diving animals
Bird common names